San Martín Chalchicuautla is a town and municipality in San Luis Potosí in central Mexico.

References

Municipalities of San Luis Potosí

San Martín Chalchicuautla is the most southeastern municipality of the state of San Luis Potosí, it is part of the Huasteca Region and has a territorial extension of 411.53 square kilometers that represent 0.68% of the total extension of San Luis Potosí; its territorial limits are to the north with the municipality of Tanquián de Escobedo and to the west with the municipality of Tampacán and with the municipality of Tamazunchale; to the northwest it limits with the state of Veracruz de Ignacio de la Llave, in particular with the municipality of Chiconamel and the municipality of Tempoal, and to the south and southeast with the State of Hidalgo, where it borders the municipality of San Felipe Orizatlán.

Orography and hydrography
The entire easternmost sector of the municipality's territory is located in the Coastal Plain of the Gulf of Mexico, which is why it is made up of mostly flat terrain with a gentle eastward inclination; To the west and south of the territory there are several mountain ranges that descend abruptly towards the plain, these mountain ranges are the foothills of the Sierra Madre Oriental and in which the water currents form small canyons oriented all from southwest to northeast.3

The main current of the municipality is the Moctezuma River that runs through the northern end marking the municipal limit of Tanquian de Escobedo, the Naranjo River and the Tampacán River arrive as tributaries to this river that run through the north of the municipality, towards the center is San Martín River and in the south of the San Pedro River; 4 the entire municipal territory belongs to the Moctezuma River Basin and the Pánuco Hydrological Region.5

Climate and ecosystems
The entire territory of San Martín Chalchicautla has a climate that is classified as semi-warm humid with abundant rains in summer, 6 the extreme north of the municipality has the highest annual average temperature in San Luis Potosí, being above 24 ° C, The rest of the territory has an annual average of 22 to 24 ° C; 7 the annual average of precipitation in the northern third of the territory is 1,200 to 1,500 mm, in the central zone 1,500 to 2,000 and a small sector in the extreme south from 2,000 to 2,500 mm.8

Practically the entire territory is dedicated to agriculture, 9 so the main species of flora are pastures; the most representative animal species are deer, tigrillo, wild cat, opossum and squirrel.

Demography
The results of the 2005 Population and Housing Count carried out by the National Institute of Statistics and Geography indicate that the total population of the municipality is 21,576 inhabitants, which are 10,800 men and 10,776 women; 10 so its percentage of male population is of 50.%, the population growth rate from 2000 to 2005 has been -0.6%, the inhabitants over 15 years of age are 36.5% of the total, while those between that age and 64 years are 54.0%, only 13.0% of the inhabitants live in localities with more than 2,500 inhabitants and therefore urban; Finally, 49.1% of the inhabitants aged five years and over are speakers of an indigenous language.11

Demographic evolution of the municipality of San Martín Chalchicuautla
Year 1990 1995 2000 2005

Population 21,846 22,968 22,373 21,576
Ethnic groups
Indigenous languages spoken in the Municipality of San Martín Chalchicuautla
Language Speakers
Nahuatl 9,476
Huasteco 18
Not specified 14
Mazahua 2
Otomi 2
Mazatec 1
Zapotec languages 1
Source: INEGI12
The two main indigenous groups that inhabit the municipality of San Martín Chachicuatla are Nahuas and Huastecos, according to the results of the 2005 count, the population older than five years of the municipality that speaks an indigenous language is a total of 9,514 inhabitants, of which 4,945 are men and 9,549 are women; of the total, 9,049 people are bilingual in Spanish, while 403 are only speakers of their mother tongue and 62 do not specify this condition.

The most widely spoken language is Nahuatl, with 9,476 speakers, followed by Huasteco with only 18 speakers, 14 inhabitants did not specify which indigenous language they spoke, in addition there are 2 Mazahua speakers and 2 Otomí as well as one Mazatec and one Zapotec. 12

Politics
The Municipality of San Martín Chalchicuautla was created in 1827, making it one of the oldest municipalities in San Luis Potosí, maintaining its municipal category since then. The government corresponds to the council, which is made up of the Municipal President, a Trustee, a Councilor elected by a relative majority and five councilors elected by the principle of proportional representation, all are elected by universal, direct and secret vote for a period of three years. non-renewable for the immediate period but if not continuously and they begin to exercise their position on January 1 of the year following their election.13

TRADITIONS
 DAY OF THE DEAD
San Martín Chalchicuautla (Mexico).- For 800 years, entire families in the Mexican region of the Huasteca have celebrated death in life at the Xantolo festival, in which they wear unique masks while dancing the traditional son .

“It comes from our ancestors. It is about celebrating what death is and mainly remembering our relatives who are no longer with us and receiving them every year, ”Cristian Camargo, 20, tells Efe in a death disguise.

In Mexico, the first days of November are reserved for the celebration of the deceased, but in this area of the eastern part of the country, the comparsas distinguish Xantolo

Xantolo is a mixture of Latin and Nahuatl that means "All Saints Day", a sign that the festival is the union of two cultures: Spanish Catholicism and indigenous traditions, explains Julio García del Ángel, researcher and master craftsman of the town of San Martín Chalchicuautla.

The essentials of this tradition, García highlights, are the masks, unique and handcrafted pieces of pemuche wood, a tree from the area, and cow, raccoon, squirrel or badger skin, which families use to dance to death and toast Offerings.

“In fact, permission is asked from the dead to be able to represent them and one lends his body to take that offering, that your loved ones take that offering through your body. One offers his body ”, says the specialist.

The comparsas represent a family with characters such as the old man, death, the devil and the comancha, who dance huasteco sones to play, remember and say goodbye to the deceased, adds García.

“It is being happy. Remember them with joy, with pleasure, because our loved ones do not scare us away. In other words, this is called the Day of the Dead, but it is not because they come to scare us, but to be with us in those moments of spirituality ”, he narrates.

In addition to these dances, the inhabitants of the town take to the streets to visit the houses of the neighbors, and go to the pantheons to bring offerings and serenades of northern music to their dead.

The artisan fights to keep this tradition alive without losing its essence

“Here, the coexistence between the living and the dead on the Day of the Dead is a very deep tradition for many years

Xantolo is now a Day of the Dead festival that is gaining popularity and attracting national and foreign tourists from October 28 to November 3.